Pedro Pablo Pasculli  (born 17 May 1960) is an Argentine former footballer who played as a forward and is currently technical secretary at Bangor City in the Cymru North.

He spent most of his career with Argentinos Juniors and Italian club Lecce. At international level, he won the 1986 FIFA World Cup with Argentina, and came fourth at the 1987 Copa América.

Pasculli's management career was mostly spent in the lower leagues of Italian football. He also had a few months in charge of Uganda in 2003, two brief spells at Dinamo Tirana in Albania and a season with Bangor City in Wales.

Playing career
Born in Santa Fe, Pasculli played as a striker for Colón de Santa Fe and Argentinos Juniors in his own country, partnering Diego Maradona at the latter. In 1985 he moved to U.S. Lecce in Italy, where he became their second highest goalscorer of all time. He retired from professional football in 1996, after playing for Casertana F.C. also in Italy, helping the club to obtain promotion to Serie C2 (4th division). He ended his football career with Pelita Jaya in Indonesia.

At international level, Pasculli won the FIFA World Cup with the Argentina national football team in 1986. He started their first match against South Korea alongside Jorge Valdano, and scored the only goal in the victory against Uruguay in the round of 16, but was unused for the rest of the tournament.

Pasculli was also chosen for the 1987 Copa América, in which Argentina came fourth on home soil. He did not play any matches in the tournament.

Coaching career
Following his retirement as a player in 1996, Pasculli began working as a coach, mainly in the lower leagues of Italian football.

Pasculli became manager of Uganda in May 2003, and led the team to a goalless draw with Sudan in his first match in Kampala. He managed the team despite being unable to speak English. In June, he missed the team's crucial 2004 Africa Cup of Nations qualifiers against Rwanda and Ghana, as his father, whom he had not seen for over two years, was gravely ill in Argentina. In September, he left the Cranes after turning down a US$24,000 contract that his agent called too low, and the representative also alleged that Pasculli had not been paid what was promised for his work.

In September 2004, Pasculli was hired by FK Dinamo Tirana of the Albanian Superliga. An article on UEFA's website called his team "lacklustre" the following month. He was replaced as manager by Faruk Sejdini, and returned to the helm in January 2005 when the latter was dismissed, and then he became director of football in March.

On 5 October 2019, Pasculli was appointed manager of Bangor City in the Cymru North, the second tier of Welsh football, after former chairman Stephen Vaughan Jr. stepped down following a 7–0 loss to Prestatyn Town. His link to the club was through new owner Domenico Serafino, an Italian musician who lived in Argentina. At the end of the season, having failed to win promotion, he was replaced by compatriot player Hugo Colace.

Playing honours

Club
 Argentinos Juniors
Primera División Argentina: Metropolitano 1984, Nacional 1985

International
 Argentina
FIFA World Cup: 1986

Individual
Argentina Primera División top scorer: Nacional 1984

References

External links

1960 births
Living people
Footballers from Santa Fe, Argentina
Argentine people of Italian descent
Association football forwards
Argentine footballers
Argentina international footballers
1986 FIFA World Cup players
1987 Copa América players
FIFA World Cup-winning players
Club Atlético Colón footballers
Argentinos Juniors footballers
U.S. Lecce players
Newell's Old Boys footballers
Sagan Tosu players
Casertana F.C. players
Pelita Bandung Raya players
Argentine Primera División players
Serie A players
Serie B players
Argentine expatriate footballers
Expatriate footballers in Italy
Argentine expatriate sportspeople in Italy
Expatriate footballers in Japan
Argentine expatriate sportspeople in Japan
Expatriate footballers in Indonesia
Argentine expatriate sportspeople in Indonesia
Argentine football managers
Uganda national football team managers
FK Dinamo Tirana managers
Argentine expatriate football managers
Expatriate football managers in Italy
Expatriate football managers in Uganda
Expatriate football managers in Albania
Argentine expatriate sportspeople in Albania
Argentine expatriate sportspeople in Uganda
Argentine expatriate sportspeople in Wales
Bangor City F.C. managers
Niki Volos F.C. managers
S.E.F. Torres 1903 managers
virtus Entella managers
Expatriate football managers in Wales